The 1915 Swarthmore Quakers football team was an American football team that represented Swarthmore College as an independent during the 1915 college football season. In their first season under head coach Bill Roper, the Quakers compiled a 5–3 record and outscored opponents by a total of 94 to 77.

Schedule

References

Swarthmore
Swarthmore Garnet Tide football seasons
Swarthmore Quakers football